Glenview Mansion is a historic home and surrounding property located at Rockville, Montgomery County, Maryland. The five-part mansion incorporates the remnants of the 1838 house called "Glenview." Since 1957, the house and grounds have been owned by the City of Rockville, and are used for various civic, cultural and social events, and is known as Rockville Civic Center Park. The house also includes the Glenview Mansion Art Gallery.

History

Catherine and Richard Johns Bowie, the original owners of the property, purchased 500 acres of land that the mansion now stands on and cleared its forests to grow corn, wheat, rye, potatoes, and hay as well as raise cattle, horses, sheep, and pigs. In 1838, they built a two-story house on the highest point of their property and named it Glenview.

Glenview remained in the Bowie family until 1904, then changed hands several times before 1917, when it was purchased by Irene and William Smith. In 1923 architects Lochie and Porter were hired to transform Glenview from a farm to a fashionable country estate designed for entertaining. The original house the Bowies built still survives in the center of the much larger Neoclassical mansion.

After Irene Lyon's death in 1950, her husband James Alexander Lyon began selling off parcels of the estate for housing developments, eventually selling the mansion to the Montgomery County Historical Society in 1954. In 1957, the City of Rockville purchased Glenview and 28 acres for $125,000 to become a civic center.

It was listed on the National Register of Historic Places in 2007.

References

External links
, at Maryland Historical Trust website
Civic Center Park - Rockville
Glenview Mansion Art Gallery

Houses completed in 1926
Houses in Montgomery County, Maryland
Houses on the National Register of Historic Places in Maryland
Neoclassical architecture in Maryland
Parks in Montgomery County, Maryland
Art museums and galleries in Maryland
Tourist attractions in Montgomery County, Maryland
Buildings and structures in Rockville, Maryland
National Register of Historic Places in Montgomery County, Maryland